Toot Toot may refer to:

 Toot, Toot!, 1998 album by Australian band The Wiggles
 "Toot Toot" (The Mighty B!), an episode of The Mighty B
 Toot-Toot (The Dresden Files), a character from The Dresden Files
 Toot Toot, a musical by Henry W. Savage

See also
 Toot (disambiguation)
 My Toot Toot